Chachoengsao Junction station is a railway station in eastern Thailand on the State Railway of Thailand's Eastern Line. In Na Mueang Sub-district, Mueang Chachoengsao District, Chachoengsao Province. Its former name was Paet Riu. The station is a class 1 railway station  from Bangkok railway station.

Train services 
 Ordinary train No. 275/276 Bangkok–Ban Klong Luk–Bangkok
 Ordinary train No. 277/278 Bangkok–Kabin Buri–Bangkok
 Ordinary train No. 279/280 Bangkok–Ban Klong Luk–Bangkok
 Ordinary train No. 281/282 Bangkok–Kabin Buri–Bangkok
 Ordinary train No. 283/284 Bangkok–Ban Phlu Ta Luang–Bangkok
 Commuter train No. 367/368 Bangkok–Chachoengsao Junction–Bangkok
 Commuter train No. 371/372 Bangkok–Prachin Buri–Bangkok
 Commuter train No. 379/380 Bangkok–Chachoengsao Junction–Bangkok
 Commuter train No. 383/384 Bangkok - Chachoengsao Junction - Bangkok
 Commuter train No. 389/390 Bangkok–Chachoengsao Junction–Bangkok
 Commuter train No. 391/388 Bangkok–Chachoengsao Junction–Bangkok
 Rapid train No. 997/998 Bangkok–Ban Phlu Ta Luang–Bangkok

Notes

References

External links 
 State Railway of Thailand
 Rotfaithai

Railway stations in Thailand